Samuels Simms may refer to:

 Samuel Simms (1784–1868) English organist and composer
 Samuel Simms (1836-1885) English organist and composer